Alan Molyneux (born 12 August 1950) is a former speedway rider from England.

Speedway career 
Molyneux reached the final of the British Speedway Championship in 1979. He rode in the top tier of British Speedway from 1973–1985, riding for various clubs.
Alan retired in 1983 but made a brief comeback in 1985 for Long Eaton to help them over injury problems.

After Speedway
Went back to the Nottingham lace industry for 17 years until the trade died out and took up employment at a factory making caravan interiors.
Married to Linda, they live in Long Eaton. They have two children and grandchildren. Apart from the occasional visit to stadiums to watch, Alan makes model speedway bikes.

References 

1950 births
Living people
British speedway riders
Birmingham Brummies riders
Coventry Bees riders
Cradley Heathens riders
Exeter Falcons riders
Leicester Lions riders
Long Eaton Invaders riders
Newport Wasps riders
Sheffield Tigers riders
Stoke Potters riders
Wolverhampton Wolves riders